DYTY (93.5 FM), broadcasting as 93.5 Brigada News FM, is a radio station owned and operated by Brigada Mass Media Corporation. The station's studio and transmitter are located at the 3rd Floor, Gosam Bldg., Maharlika Highway, Brgy. Diit, Tacloban.

History
It was established in 1993 under the Bay Radio network. In 2010, Prime Media Services took over the station's management and rebranded it as Dream Radio. In October 2013, shortly after Baycomms was acquired by Brigada, the station was relaunched as Brigada News FM, with Dream Radio moving to Tagbilaran Broadcasting System-owned 103.1 FM. In 2016, it went off the air due to lack of listeners.

On July 4, 2022, Brigada News FM returned the airwaves as a test broadcast. On September 12, it was officially launched with its programming and personalities led by former Kaboses Radio anchorman Junel Tomes.

References

Radio stations in Tacloban
Radio stations established in 1993